Frank Collinson (died 1811) was an English jockey, who won the 1808 Derby.

Collinson was the son of a Yorkshire farmer and joined the stable of Christopher Jackson at Middleham as a young boy, where he learnt to ride "in a masterly Yorkshire style"

In 1808, he won the Derby on a 20/1 outsider, Pan, by half a length at odds from a field of ten for a prize of £1,260. He was somewhat fortunate to win, as the jockey on the runner-up, Bill Clift, had failed to notice Collinson's challenge until it was too late. In winning the Derby, however, he paid a fatal price. On his way to Epsom for the race, he slept in a damp bed at an inn and contracted the illness that would kill him.

Major wins 
 Great Britain
Epsom Derby - Pan (1808)

References

Bibliography 
 

1811 deaths
English jockeys
Year of birth unknown